Sandile Ngcobo (born 1 March 1953) is former justice in the Constitutional Court of South Africa. He served as Chief Justice from 2009 to 2011.

In 2017, the Southern African Public Law journal published a special issue in volume 32 of the journal under the title: "Twenty-First Century Constitutional Jurisprudence of South Africa: the Contribution of Former Chief Justice S. Sandile Ngcobo" in which academics, judges and practitioners examined Justice Ngcobo's jurisprudence during his tenure at the bench. The special issue was edited by Professor Ntombizozuko Dyani-Mhango, a former clerk of the Justice Ngcobo. See,

Education

Justice Ngcobo received a Fulbright scholarship and he holds an LLM degree from Harvard Law School, where he is a visiting professor of law. He is also a visiting professor of law at Columbia Law School and an adjunct professor of law at Cornell Law School.

Career

From 1986 to 1987, Ngcobo clerked for A. Leon Higginbotham, Jr., a United States federal judge.

Ngcobo was made an honorary professor of law by the University of Cape Town.

He was appointed to the Constitutional Court in 1999 by Nelson Mandela. Prior to this he was a judge in the Cape High Court and the Labour Appeal Court.

On 6 August 2009, President Jacob Zuma nominated Ngcobo to succeed Pius Langa as Chief Justice of South Africa in October 2009.

References

1953 births
Living people
University of Natal alumni
Harvard Law School alumni
Judges of the Constitutional Court of South Africa
Chief justices of South Africa
People from Durban
20th-century South African judges
21st-century South African judges